Kuri railway station or Kura railway station (Code: KIF) is an 'F-Class' halt railway station, situated at the Kollam–Sengottai branch line of Southern Railway, India. The station is situated between Avaneeswaram and  railway stations in Kollam district, Kerala. The station is coming under Madurai railway division of Southern Railway zone. The nearest major rail head of Kuri railway station is Kollam Junction railway station.

Significance
Kuri is one of the most neglected railway stations in India. Even railway authorities are forgetting sometimes to include this station in railway news and websites. This is the nearest railway station to Thalavoor Devi temple. Rural areas like Thalavoor, Mylom, Kura, Kulamudi, Alakuzhy, Thamarakudy in Pathanapuram/Kottarakara taluks are depending on this railway station.

Services

See also

 Kollam Junction railway station
 Paravur railway station
 Kottarakara railway station
 Punalur railway station

References

Kuri
Thiruvananthapuram railway division
1904 establishments in India
Railway stations opened in 1904